Jason Matthew Jaspers (born April 8, 1981) is a Canadian professional ice hockey centre who is currently an unrestricted free agent. He most recently played for the Grizzlys Wolfsburg of the Deutsche Eishockey Liga (DEL).

Playing career
Jaspers was drafted 71st overall by the Phoenix Coyotes in the 1999 NHL Entry Draft. He was drafted from the Sudbury Wolves of the Ontario Hockey League.  Jaspers made his professional debut in the 2001–02 season with the Coyotes affiliate the Springfield Falcons of the American Hockey League. Jaspers made his NHL debut in the same season, after he received his first NHL call-up on January 20, 2002.

Jaspers then spent the next four years primarily with the Falcons of the AHL. Unable to crack the NHL regularly he was traded by the Coyotes to the Tampa Bay Lightning for Jarrod Skalde on July 25, 2005. Jason however never played a game with the Lightning, instead playing for their affiliate, coincidentally still the Springfield Falcons.

Jaspers finally left the Falcons, ranking second in all-time appearances, in the 2006–07 season when he signed with German team Adler Mannheim, on July 6, 2006. After three years with Adler Mannheim signed on April 6, 2009, with Kölner Haie.

Jaspers played for three seasons with the Thomas Sabo Ice Tigers, before opting to sign a one-year contract to continue his professional career in the DEL with the Iserlohn Roosters on June 23, 2015.

After three seasons with the Roosters, Jaspers left the club at the conclusion of his contract, playing on a try-out through pre-season before signing a one-year deal with Eisbären Berlin prior to the 2018–19 season on September 11, 2018. He played in just 9 games with Eisbären Berlin before opting to terminate his contract in order to join his sixth DEL club, Grizzlys Wolfsburg, on October 10, 2018. Jaspers played out the remainder of the regular season with Grizzlys, adding 8 points in 29 games, before leaving the club at the conclusion of the year.

Personal life 
In July 2008, Jaspers married his high school sweetheart, Morgan McKee. McKee is from Sudbury, Ontario where Jason played junior hockey for the Sudbury Wolves. Jason divorced Morgan in 2012.

Career statistics

Awards and honours

References

External links

1981 births
Adler Mannheim players
Canadian ice hockey centres
Canadian expatriate ice hockey players in Germany
Eisbären Berlin players
Ice hockey people from Ontario
Iserlohn Roosters players
Sportspeople from Thunder Bay
Kölner Haie players
Living people
Arizona Coyotes draft picks
Phoenix Coyotes players
Springfield Falcons players
Sudbury Wolves players
Thomas Sabo Ice Tigers players
Utah Grizzlies (AHL) players
Grizzlys Wolfsburg players